...And Out Come the Wolves is the third studio album by American punk rock band Rancid. It was released on August 22, 1995, through Epitaph Records. Rancid's popularity and catchy songs made them the subject of a major label bidding war (hence the title, ...And Out Come the Wolves taken from a poem in Jim Carroll's The Basketball Diaries) that ended with the band staying on Epitaph. With a sound heavily influenced by ska, which called to mind Tim Armstrong and Matt Freeman's past in Operation Ivy, Rancid became one of the few bands of the mid-to late-1990s boom in punk rock to retain much of its original fanbase. In terms of record sales and certifications, ...And Out Come the Wolves is a popular album in the United States. It produced three hit singles: "Roots Radicals", "Time Bomb" and "Ruby Soho", that earned Rancid its heaviest airplay on MTV and radio stations to date. All the singles charted on Modern Rock Tracks. ...And Out Come the Wolves was certified gold by the RIAA on January 22, 1996. It was certified platinum on September 23, 2004.

Along with Bad Religion's Stranger than Fiction, Green Day's Dookie and The Offspring's Smash, ...And Out Come the Wolves helped revive mainstream interest in punk rock in the mid-1990s, signaled the initial rise of mainstream punk rock, and proved to be successful for the band. To coincide with its 20th anniversary, Rancid performed the album live in its entirety on their 2015–2016 Honor Is All We Know world tour.

Background 
Rancid formed in Albany, California, in 1991. They signed to Epitaph Records (founded by Bad Religion guitarist Brett Gurewitz) in 1992 and released their eponymous debut album, Rancid, a year later to rave reviews. While Rancid was already writing another album, Green Day's Billie Joe Armstrong, one of the band's friends, joined them to co-write the song "Radio". This led to him playing a live show with the band, and Rancid frontman Tim Armstrong eventually asked him to become a member of the band, but he decided to continue playing in Green Day. Armstrong had previously asked Lars Frederiksen to be Rancid's second guitarist, but he turned down the request. After Billie Joe declined, Frederiksen changed his mind and decided to join the band. Rancid's second album, Let's Go, was released in 1994 to unexpected success and acclaim. After the release of Green Day's Dookie and The Offspring's Smash later that year, Rancid was pursued by several major labels, including Madonna's Maverick Records, but eventually turned them down. They decided to stay on Epitaph and soon began recording a follow-up album.

Recording and production 
...And Out Come the Wolves was recorded mainly between February and May 1995. The recording took place at not only Fantasy Studios in Berkeley, California (where Let's Go was recorded), but also at the famous Electric Lady Studios (built by Jimi Hendrix) in New York City. This was the first time Rancid recorded an album at more than one studio.

Rather than having the band's previous producer Brett Gurewitz, Jerry Finn was appointed to produce the album. Gurewitz would eventually start working with the band again, beginning with 2000's Rancid.

Release, reception and legacy 

...And Out Come the Wolves was released on August 22, 1995, and peaked at number 45 on the Billboard 200 album chart. Five months after its release, the album was certified gold and in 2004 it was certified platinum.

The album received positive reviews, Stephen Thomas Erlewine of AllMusic described the album as having "classic moments of revivalist punk". Erlewine praised the music and claims the album "doesn't mark an isolationist retreat into didactic, defiantly underground punk rock". The album received a rating of four and a half out of five stars, while "Time Bomb," "Ruby Soho" and "Roots Radicals" earned Rancid its heaviest airplay on MTV and radio stations to date. In 2005, ...And Out Come the Wolves was ranked number 368 in Rock Hard magazine's book The 500 Greatest Rock & Metal Albums of All Time. BuzzFeed included the album at number 14 on their "36 Pop Punk Albums You Need To Hear Before You F——ing Die" list. Cleveland.com ranked "Ruby Soho" at number 21 on their list of the top 100 pop-punk songs.

On May 21, 2021, it was announced that Lavasock Records is releasing a tribute album titled ...And Out Come the Lawsuits featuring Link 80, Sarchasm, Omnigone, Flying Raccoon Suit, Little Debbie & The Crusaders and Stay Wild.

Professional wrestler Dori Prange came up with her in-ring name, Ruby Riott, from the song "Ruby Soho". Prange lost the rights to the name after her release from the WWE in June 2021 however thanks to Lars Frederiksen, who hosts a wrestling podcast, she now wrestles under the name of Ruby Soho.

Artwork 
The cover art is a tribute to Minor Threat, a landmark hardcore punk band, that originally used the image of Alec MacKaye (brother of the band's lead singer Ian MacKaye) with his head on his knees on steps of the Wilson Center steps on their eponymous debut EP.

Track listing

Personnel 

Rancid
 Tim Armstrong – vocals, guitar
 Lars Frederiksen – guitar, vocals
 Matt Freeman – bass guitar, backing vocals
 Brett Reed – drums

Additional musicians
 Bashiri Johnson – percussion
 Paul Jackson – Hammond organ
 DJ Disk – scratching (track 7)
 Jim Carroll – vocals (track 7)
Eric Dinn - drums

Artwork
 Lars Frederiksen – cover art, cover photo
 Jesse Fischer – artwork, photography

Production
 Jerry Finn – producer, mixing
 Brett Gurewitz – engineer
 Andy Wallace – mixing
 Howie Weinberg – mastering
 Michael Rosen – engineer
 Joe Pirrera – assistant engineer
 Frank Rinella – assistant engineer
 Steve Sisco – assistant engineer
 Mike Fasano – technician

Charts

Certifications

References 

Rancid (band) albums
1995 albums
Epitaph Records albums
Albums produced by Jerry Finn
Albums recorded at Electric Lady Studios